Lawrence Smith  (born March 16, 1985) is an American soccer player, who plays for GBK.

References
Guardian Football

1985 births
Living people
American soccer players
American expatriate soccer players
Expatriate footballers in Finland
Veikkausliiga players
Ykkönen players
Vaasan Palloseura players
Kokkolan Palloveikot players
Association football forwards
Soccer players from South Carolina
GBK Kokkola players